Emmit King (March 24, 1959 – November 28, 2021) was an American track and field sprinter, who twice was a member of the American Relay Team for the Summer Olympics (1984 and 1988) but he did not compete. He is best known for winning the bronze medal at the inaugural 1983 World Championships in the men's 100 metres. At the same championships, he was part of the team that won gold in the 4x100 m relay for the United States, and in doing so set a new world record of 37.86 s. He set his personal best (10.04) in the 100 metres on June 17, 1988, at the 1988 USA Outdoor Track and Field Championships in Tampa, Florida.

While at the University of Alabama, King became the 1983 NCAA 100 meters National Champion (10.15 seconds). 

King was also twice national champion at the short sprint indoors: in 1984 at 60 yards and in 1988 at 55 metres.

In 1986, he became a member of Phi Beta Sigma fraternity through the Theta Delta chapter at the University. King was also a graduate of Hueytown High School in Alabama. In 1986 he married fellow Olympian Lillie Leatherwood.

King was killed in a shooting after a dispute on November 28, 2021, in Bessemer, Alabama. He was 62.

Rankings
King was ranked among the best in the US and the world in the 100 m sprint event in the period 1979 to 1988, according to the votes of the experts of Track and Field News.

References

External links

US Olympic Team

1959 births
2021 deaths
Alabama Crimson Tide men's track and field athletes
American male sprinters
Athletes (track and field) at the 1979 Pan American Games
Athletes (track and field) at the 1984 Summer Olympics
Athletes (track and field) at the 1988 Summer Olympics
Olympic track and field athletes of the United States
Pan American Games bronze medalists for the United States
Pan American Games medalists in athletics (track and field)
Sportspeople from Bessemer, Alabama
Track and field athletes from Alabama
World Athletics Championships medalists
World Athletics Championships athletes for the United States
Hueytown High School alumni
USA Outdoor Track and Field Championships winners
USA Indoor Track and Field Championships winners
World Athletics Championships winners
Medalists at the 1979 Pan American Games
Deaths by firearm in Alabama
American murderers